MNG may refer to:

Places
 Maningrida Airport (IATA: MNG), Northern Territory, Australia
 Manningtree railway station (station code	MNG), Essex, England
 Mongolia, see List of FIFA country codes
 Montgomery station (West Virginia), U.S., Amtrak station code

Biology and Medicine
 Methylnitronitrosoguanidine, a mutagen
 Midline nuclear group, a region of the thalamus in the vertebrate brain

Organisations
 MNG Maritime, floating armoury company
 MNG Group of Companies
 MNG Airlines, a Turkish cargo airline
 MNG Enterprises, an American newspaper & media company
  or Galician Nationalist Youth, a political youth organization in Galicia, Spain

Other
 Mnong language (ISO 639:mng)
 Multiple-image Network Graphics, a graphics file format